The Road to Ruin is a 1928 American silent black-and-white exploitation film directed by Norton S. Parker and starring Helen Foster. The film is about a teenage girl, Sally Canfield, whose life is led astray by sex and drugs, and ruined by an abortion. The film was remade as a talkie in 1934.

Cast
Helen Foster as Sally Canfield
Grant Withers as Don Hughes
Florence Turner as Mrs. Canfield
Charles Miller as Mr. Canfield
Virginia Roye as Eve Terrell
Thomas Carr as Jimmy Canfield
Don Rader as Al
Eddie Dunn as Strip Poker Player
Joe Darensbourg as Musician in Barn Dance Scene (uncredited)
Kallie Foutz as Extra (uncredited)
Walter James as Headwaiter (uncredited)

Production
The Road to Ruin was made on a budget of either $15,000 or $25,000, making it one of the cheapest films made that year. Director Norton S. Parker later told his wife that lead actress Helen Foster was much like her character in that she was relatively naive; during the filming of the strip poker scenes, Parker kept a bottle of hard alcohol to offer Foster liquid courage. The film was shot by Henry Cronjager using a hand-cranked camera typical of the era, but at faster-than-normal crank speed; this helped fill up each reel and getting the final film to feature length, but had the effect of making all the action in the film move slower.

References

External links

1928 films
American silent feature films
American black-and-white films
1920s exploitation films
1928 drama films
1920s English-language films
1920s American films